Soslan Dzhioyev may refer to:

 Soslan Dzhioyev (footballer, born 1989), Russian footballer
 Soslan Dzhioyev (footballer, born 1993), Russian footballer